The governor of Illinois is the head of government of the U.S. state of Illinois. The governor is the head of the executive branch of Illinois's state government and is charged with enforcing state laws. The governor has the power to either approve or veto bills passed by the Illinois Legislature, to convene the legislature, and to grant pardons, except in cases of impeachment. The governor is also the commander-in-chief of the state's military forces.

Since becoming a state in 1818, 43 people have served as governor of Illinois; before statehood, it had only one territorial governor, Ninian Edwards. The longest-serving governor was James R. Thompson, who was elected to four terms lasting 14 years, from 1977 to 1991. Only one governor, Richard J. Oglesby, has served multiple non-consecutive terms, having been elected in 1864, 1872, and 1884.

The current governor is J. B. Pritzker, who took office on January 14, 2019.

Governors

Governor of the Territory of Illinois
Illinois Territory was formed on March 1, 1809, from Indiana Territory. It had only two governors appointed by the President of the United States before it became a state, and only one ever took office.

Governors of the State of Illinois
Illinois was admitted to the Union on December 3, 1818, consisting of the southern portion of Illinois Territory; the remainder was assigned to Michigan Territory.

The first Illinois Constitution, ratified in 1818, provided that a governor be elected every 4 years for a term starting on the first Monday in the December following an election. The constitution of 1848 moved the start of the term to the second Monday in January starting in 1849, thus shortening the term won in the 1844 election to 2 years. Governors were not allowed to succeed themselves until the 1870 constitution, which removed this limit.

The office of lieutenant governor was created in the first constitution, to exercise the power of governor if that office becomes vacant. The 1848 constitution changed this to say the power "devolves" upon the lieutenant governor in case of a vacancy. The current constitution of 1970 made it so that, in the event of a vacancy, the lieutenant becomes governor, and the governor and lieutenant governor are now elected on the same ticket. If the governor feels seriously impeded in performing their job, they can inform the secretary of state and the next in the line of succession, who becomes acting governor until the governor can resume office.

See also
 List of Illinois state legislatures
 List of commandants of the Illinois Country

Notes

References
General

 
 
 
 

Constitutions

 
 
 
 

Specific

Lists of Illinois politicians
Illinois
Political history of Illinois